Acmaturris scalida is an extinct species of sea snail, a marine gastropod mollusk in the family Mangeliidae.

Description
The length of the shell attains 11.2 mm, its diameter 3.9 mm.

Distribution
Fossils have been found in Pliocene strata of the Bowden Formation, Jamaica, age range: 3.6 to 2.588 Ma

References

 W. P. Woodring. 1928. Miocene Molluscs from Bowden, Jamaica. Part 2: Gastropods and discussion of results . Contributions to the Geology and Palaeontology of the West Indies

scalida
Gastropods described in 1928